Mineral Historic District is a national historic district located at Mineral, Louisa County, Virginia. It encompasses 222 contributing buildings, 3 contributing sites, and 6 contributing structures in the town of Mineral.  It includes a variety of residential, commercial, and institutional buildings built after the town was platted in 1890. Notable buildings include the Gibson House (1915), Turner House (c. 1915), Dr. H. J. Judd House (1906), Odd Fellows Hall (1894), former D.E. Bumpass Department Store, former Mineral Drug Store, Bank of Louisa (now Town Hall), C&O railroad depot (1880s), Mineral Crystal Ice Plant (c. 1925), Louisa County Power & Light Plant (c. 1925), Standard Oil Company building (1907), Episcopal Church of Incarnation (1902-1903), Mineral Baptist Church (1906), and the former Mineral School (1927).

It was listed on the National Register of Historic Places in 2005.

References

Historic districts on the National Register of Historic Places in Virginia
Victorian architecture in Virginia
Neoclassical architecture in Virginia
Buildings and structures in Louisa County, Virginia
National Register of Historic Places in Louisa County, Virginia